Nadiia Volodymyrivna Dorofieieva (born 21 April 1990), professionally known as DOROFEEVA, is a Ukrainian pop singer, fashion designer, blogger, actress and a former member of the pop duo Vremya i Steklo, which was created and produced by Potap.

Early life and education
Nadiia Dorofieieva was born 21 April 1990 in Simferopol, Ukraine. From a young age, Dorofieieva was engaged in music and dancing. In 2002, at the age of 12, Dorofieieva became regional champion in ballroom dancing, being crowned the prize of best ballroom dancer in her native Crimea. 

In 2005, after finishing the ninth class, Dorofieieva moved to Moscow, where she started studying at the Moscow State Art and Cultural University for a degree in singing.

Career

2002-2009: Early career, Chance  and Glam
Dorofieieva first rose to prominence as a participant in several Ukrainian and foreign music competitions. In 2004, she won the first prize in the "middle category" of the Black Sea Games children's singing competition in Skadovsk. In 2005, she participated in the Ukrainian television show Chance, a spin-off of Karaoke on the Maidan. 

While living in Moscow, between 2005 and 2007, Dorofieieva was part of the girl group МЧС. With the group, Dorofieieva recorded an album and also performed on Russian federal television, including a performance of the song "Monetka" on Cabaret of 100 stars on NTV in 2007. 

At the age of 17, Dorofieieva signed up in another spin-off of Karaoke on the Maidan, titled American Chance. Dorofieieva was selected as one of the twelve participants of the show and travelled to Los Angeles in late 2007 to continue the selection process. There, she ended up as one of the five selected singers in the girl band Glam. Glam was acquired by David Junk, who previously acquired and promoted t.A.T.u. and Smash!! in the English-speaking world, to become a Ukrainian analogue to the Spice Girls. However, as the U.S. financial crisis erupted, the project was dropped and Dorofieieva was told to find a new job. Glam recorded one promotional song "Thirsty", which was uploaded on YouTube in 2008, but never commercially released. 

After her American dream fell apart, Dorofieieva developed her own solo project, which was called Markiza, in which she took a similar pop rock style to Avril Lavigne. In 2008, she released a solo album under that name.

2010-2020: Vremya i Steklo, national breakthrough

Dorofieieva passed the internet casting to become the female soloist in the duo Vremya i Steklo, alongside rapper Oleksii Zavhorodnii (Positiff). The duo was produced by Potap. With this, Dorofieieva moved back to Kyiv. In December 2010, the duo released their first single, which only acquired mild commercial success in their native Ukraine. In the subsequent years, Dorofieieva toured Ukraine with Vremya i Steklo alongside Potap & Nastya. 

The group enjoyed their breakthrough in 2015 with the single "Imya 505", which gave the duo their final breakthrough in Russia. The song became a viral sensation and quickly became the most-watched Russian-language song ever on YouTube. Their music videos on YouTube later became a source for their popularity.

As a result of the group's rise of fame, Dorofieieva became a popular influencer. In 2016, she started her own clothing line. A year later, she started vlogging on her YouTube channel DoDo Vlog, quickly becoming one of the most-subscribed to channels in Ukraine. In 2018, Dorofieieva and her colleague Oleksii Zavhorodnii voiced the heroes of Ukrainian animation film – "The Stolen Princess".

In autumn 2017, she took part in a Ukrainian version of the show "Tantsi z zirkamy" (Dancing with the stars) on 1+1. After "Tantsi z zirkamy", she became a coach (together with her colleague Positiff, part of Vremya i Steklo) on "Holos. Dity" (The voice kids) on 1+1.

In 2018, Nadiya became a judge in the Ukrainian TV-show "Liha smikhu" (League of laughter) on 1+1.

2020-present: Solo career
On 20 November 2020, she released her first song as DOROFEEVA, gorit. In less than a week, the music video has got more than two million views on YouTube.

Discography

Studio albums

Solo 
 Markiza (2008)
 Sensi (2022)

М.Ч.С. 
 Seti lyubvi (2007)

Vremya i Steklo 
 Vremya i Steklo (2014)
 Glubokiy dom (2015)
 Vislovo (2019)

Singles

Solo

Vremya i Steklo 
 2010 – "Tak vypala karta"
 2011 – "Lyubvi tochka net"
 2011 – "Serebryanoye more"
 2011 – "Kafel" (in Russian)
 2012 – "Garmoshka" / "Harmonica"
 2012 – "Sleza" (feat. Potap)
 2013 – "#kAroche"
 2013 – "Potantsuy so mnoy"
 2014 – "Zaberi"
 2015 – "Imya 505"
 2015 – "Pesnya 404"
 2016 – "Navernopotomushto"
 2016 - "Na stile"
 2017 - "Back2Leto"
 2017 – "Ritm 122"
 2017 - "Troll"
 2018 - "Do zirok"
 2018 - "Top"
 2018 - "Promin" (feat. Michelle Andrade & Mozgi band)
 2018 - "Ye, boy"
 2018 - "Pesnya pro litso"
 2019 - "Dym"
 2019 - "Vislovo"
 2019 - "Lokh"
 2020 - "Navsegda/Nikogda"
 2020 - "Last dance"

Rewards 
Nadiya Dorofeeva received the following awards, titles and distinctions:

 2002 - Grand Prix of the vocal competition Southern Express.
 2002 - champion of the Crimea in ballroom dancing.
 2002 - second prize at the international competition of Bogatikov.
2003 - winner of the second prize Sun. Youth. Beauty (Bulgaria).
2004 - winner of the first prize of the Ukrainian competition Black Sea Games.
2004 - Grand Prix of the Ukrainian competition Star Rain.
2004 - member of the jury of the international children's competition Our Land is Ukraine in Artek.
2005 - finalist of the TV project Chance.
2005 - victory in the Moscow competition Golden Voice.
2006 - Grand Prix of Ilya Reznik's contest Little Country.
2017 - victory in the nomination Singer of the Year in the Cosmopolitan Awards 2017.
2018 - victory in the special nomination Ty prosto cosmos in the Russian music award Zhara Music Awards.
2018 - winner of the Ukrainian music award YUNA in the nomination Best Video for a duet song with Dmitry Monatik Hluboko.

References

External links 

 Official site of the group Vremya i Steklo

Living people
Actors from Simferopol
People from the Crimean Oblast
21st-century Ukrainian women singers
Ukrainian pop singers
1990 births
Musicians from Simferopol